Apolipoprotein L2 is a protein that in humans is encoded by the APOL2 gene.

This gene is a member of the apolipoprotein L gene family and protein in this family are lipid-binding proteins. This gene encodes a 37.1 kDa protein and The protein sequence contains 337bp.  Localization of this protein is mainly found in the cytosol, nucleoplasm and additionally, it is also seen in the Nuclear bodies.  The involvement of this gene may affect in the movement of lipids and binding of lipids to organelles. Two transcript variants encoding the same protein have been found for this gene.

Protein Sequence 

>sp|Q9BQE5|1-337

MNPESSIFIEDYLKYFQDQVSRENLLQLLTDDEAWNGFVAAAELPRDEADELRKALNKLA

SHMVMKDKNRHDKDQQHRQWFLKEFPRLKRELEDHIRKLRALAEEVEQVHRGTTIANVVS

NSVGTTSGILTLLGLGLAPFTEGISFVLLDTGMGLGAAAAVAGITCSVVELVNKLRARAQ

ARNLDQSGTNVAKVMKEFVGGNTPNVLTLVDNWYQVTQGIGRNIRAIRRARANPQLGAYA

PPPHIIGRISAEGGEQVERVVEGPAQAMSRGTMIVGAATGGILLLLDVVSLAYESKHLLE

GAKSESAEELKKRAQELEGKLNFLTKIHEMLQPGQDQ

Interactions 

APOL2 has been shown to interact with:

 IFN-γ, 

 CD81, 

 TNF-α, 

 Bcl-2,

Splice Variants 

ApoL2 has 5 splice variants,
APOL2-001
This transcript has got 6 exons, 12 domains and features are annotated, 263 variations are related this and maps to 35 oligo probes.
APOL2-002
This transcript has got 5 exons,  12 domains and features are annotated, 263 variations are related with this gene and maps to 37 oligo probes.
APOL2-006
This transcript has got 6 exons, is annotated with 3 domains and features, 62 variations are related with this gene and maps to 20 oligo probes.
APOL2-008
This transcript has got 6 exons, 12 domains and features are annotated, 331 variations are related with this gene and maps to 32 oligo probes.
APOL2-009
This transcript has got 5 exons, 4 domains and features are annotated, 104 variations are related with this gene and maps to 13 oligo probes.

Functions of the ApoL2 
Acute Inflammation Response  
 Cholesterol Metabolic Process 
Lipid Metabolic Process
Maternal Process Involved in Female Pregnancy
 Lipid binding
 Signalling Receptor Binding
 Aging

References

External links

Further reading